Carabidobius is a genus of mites in the family Acaridae.

Species
 Carabidobius bartheli (Turk & Turk, 1957)
 Carabidobius bifurcatus (Mahunka, 1973)
 Carabidobius radiatus Volgin, 1953
 Carabidobius regleri (Turk & Turk, 1957)

References

Acaridae